This article shows the players that have played been selected by the Queensland Rugby League (QRL) for the Queensland Academy of Sport (QAS) Emerging Origin squad. The squad meets for a weekend camp, usually held in January, run by the current Queensland State of Origin coach.

In earlier years, a player could be named in the next season's squad, despite already making their State of Origin debut. Since 2010, once a player has represented Queensland, they are deemed to have "graduated" from the squad and are not selected again. Since 2001, 66 players who have participated in the program have been selected to play for Queensland in State of Origin.

2001
The inaugural Emerging Origin squad featured one player who had previously represented Queensland (Stuart Kelly in 1997), while Michael Ryan and Michael Luck were the only players in the squad who wouldn't play State of Origin during their careers. Two members, Chris Beattie and Nathan Fien, played for Queensland in the 2001 series.

2002
Just seven of the 17 players in the 2002 squad would go on to represent Queensland. Cameron Smith, the current Queensland captain and their most capped player, and Johnathan Thurston, Queensland's second most capped player and highest point scorer, were selected for the first time. Justin Hodges made his debut for Queensland in the 2002 series.

2004
The 2004 squad featured seven players who had previously represented Queensland, while five members of the squad would make their State of Origin debut later that year. Brent Webb, Brett Seymour, Jaiman Lowe and Michael Witt were the only players who would not go onto represent Queensland during their careers. Webb, a Cairns Kangaroos junior playing for the New Zealand Warriors, would represent New Zealand later in the year under residency grounds, thus making him ineligible to play for Queensland.

2005
10 members of the 2005 Emerging Origin squad would represent Queensland during their careers. Ashley Harrison, Johnathan Thurston and Ty Williams all made their Origin debut in the 2005 series, while Carl Webb was recalled to the side after a four-year absence. Tom Learoyd-Lahrs, who was born and raised in the Northern Rivers region of New South Wales, was originally thought to be eligible for Queensland after joining the Broncos as a teenager but was later ruled ineligible. He later played four games for New South Wales.

2006
The 2006 squad featured 12 players who would be a part of Queensland's historic eight-straight series wins, with Steven Bell, Greg Inglis, Dallas Johnson Adam Mogg, Nate Myles, David Stagg and Sam Thaiday all making their Origin debuts later in the year. This would also be Nathan Fien's last appearance in the squad, as he would opt to represent New Zealand in 2006, making him ineligible to represent Queensland again.

2008
Four players, Matt Ballin, David Shillington, Will Chambers and David Taylor, would go on to play State of Origin for Queensland.

2009
Four members of the 2009 squad would go onto represent Queensland in their careers, while Corey Parker had previously played State of Origin. Parker, who last played for Queensland in 2005, was recalled to their side for the 2009 series. Brett Seymour made his final appearance in the squad, as did Ashley Graham, who returned for the first time since 2002. David Shillington was the only player from the squad who made his Origin debut in that year's series.

2010
The 2010 squad was the first to start the tradition of not selecting players with State of Origin experience. Just three players from the squad went onto to play State Origin, with David Taylor making his debut in that year's series.

2011

2012

2013

2014

2015

2016

2017

2018

2019

References

External links
QAS Emerging Origin squads at qrl.com.au

 
Rugby League State of Origin